Huffnagle was a stop on the Reading Company's New Hope Branch that served the small community of Hood, Pennsylvania. The station was named in reference to the nearby Huffnagle Mansion. It was renamed twice during its existence, first to Rosenthal (occasionally spelled Rosen Thal) after artist Albert Rosenthal (who had purchased the mansion), in 1927, and then to Hood in the 1940s, after a family of the name took up residence in the aforementioned Huffnagle Mansion. 

The station itself was located at Sugan Road at milepost 36, approximately 1 mile south of New Hope. No trace of this station exists aside from a small flat spot next to Sugan Road Crossing.

References 

Former Reading Company stations
Former railway stations in Bucks County, Pennsylvania
Railway stations in the United States opened in 1891